The Deed of Surrender or Rupert's Land and North-Western Territory Order is an 1870 British order in council that transferred ownership of Rupert's Land and the North-Western Territory from the Hudson's Bay Company (HBC) to the newly created Dominion of Canada. The Deed ended just over 200 years of HBC control over the lands and began western Canadian expansion. While the Deed of Surrender was actually only a schedule in the order, the name "Deed of Surrender" is generally understood to refer to the document as a whole. Often confused with Rupert's Land Act 1868, the deed is different as the act only expressed that the United Kingdom and Canada permitted the transfer, but did not settle on the details of exchange with HBC, which were outlined in the Deed of Surrender.

History 

On May 2, 1670, King Charles II of England granted the HBC a royal charter for "the sole Trade and Commerce of all those Seas, Streights, Bays, Rivers, Lakes, Creeks, and Sounds, in whatsoever Latitude they shall be, that lie within the entrance of the Streights commonly called Hudson's Streights... which are not now actually possessed by any of our Subjects, or by the Subjects of any other Christian Prince or State... and that the said Land be from henceforth... called Rupert's Land". Due to the extent of the lands granted not truly being known at the time, in 1821, the British Parliament further extended the company's domain to the North-Western Territory as well with the passage of "An act for regulating the fur trade, and establishing a criminal and civil jurisdiction within certain parts of North America".

In 1867, with Confederation, the new Dominion of Canada sought to expand westward. In that same year, Canada's Parliament expressed this desire to the United Kingdom and soon after entered into talks with the HBC to arrange for the transfer of the territory. These talks resulted in the Deed of Surrender, which was part of an order-in-council by the United Kingdom titled "Rupert's Land and North-Western Territory - Enactment No. 3: Order of Her Majesty in Council admitting Rupert's Land and the North-Western Territory into the union, dated the 23rd day of June 1870". The Deed was approved and issued on June 23, 1870, and took effect on July 15, 1870. The Province of Manitoba, the first new province to join Confederation, was created on the same day.

References 

1870 in British law
1870 in Canadian law
Annexation
Hudson's Bay Company
Land law
Orders in Council